Microwave welding is a plastic welding process that utilizes alternating electromagnetic fields in the microwave band to join thermoplastic base materials that are melted by the phenomenon of dielectric heating.

See also 

 Dielectric heating
 Plastic welding
 Radio-frequency welding

References 

Welding
Radio technology